Epe is a municipality and a town in the eastern Netherlands.

The municipality has a population of 32,191 (2015, source: CBS), and the town itself has a population of 15,552.

Another important town within the municipality is Vaassen (12,739 inhabitants), halfway between Epe and Apeldoorn. It has an interesting castle called 'Kasteel De Cannenburgh', which is open to visitors (guided tour compulsory). Epe, Vaassen and also the village of Oene each have a medieval church. Other population centres of interest are Emst, Gortel, Tongeren, Wissel and Zuuk.

International relations

Twin towns — sister cities
Epe is twinned with:

Notable people 
 Antonie Pannekoek (1873 in Vaassen – 1960) a Dutch astronomer, Marxist theorist and social revolutionary
 Henry G. Schermers (1928 in Epe – 2006) lawyer and academic
 Menno-Jan Kraak (born 1958 in Vaassen) a Dutch cartographer and academic
 Esther Hart (born 1970 in Epe) singer

Sport 
 Marc Overmars (born 1973 in Emst) football player with 399 club caps
 John Stegeman (born 1976 in Epe) former footballer and former manager of Heracles Almelo
 Teun Mulder (born 1981 in Zuuk) track cyclist, bronze medallist at the 2012 Summer Olympics

References

External links

Official website

 
Municipalities of Gelderland
Populated places in Gelderland